Tom Curran (1920 - June 2005) was an Irish hurler who played as a left corner-forward for the Waterford senior team.

Born in Dungarvan, County Waterford, Curran first played competitive hurling in his youth. After enjoying success as a Gaelic footballer with the Waterford junior team, he subsequently became a regular member of the Waterford senior hurling team. Curran went on to win one All-Ireland medal and one Munster medal.

At club level Curran was a six-time championship medallist with Dungarvan as a dual player.

Honours

Team

Dungarvan
Waterford Senior Hurling Championship (1): 1941
Waterford Senior Football Championship (5): 1945, 1946, 1947, 1948, 1954

Waterford
All-Ireland Senior Hurling Championship (1): 1948
Munster Senior Hurling Championship (1): 1948

References

1920 births
2005 deaths
Dungarvan hurlers
Dungarvan Gaelic footballers
Waterford inter-county hurlers
Waterford inter-county Gaelic footballers
All-Ireland Senior Hurling Championship winners